The Big Help is a community outreach program made famous in 1994 by Nickelodeon. It was a yearly event in which kids from around the country would call in to try to get one of their local parks refurbished by Nickelodeon, the ten with the most votes would get refurbished by Nickelodeon in an eight-hour special. There were special instances like the September 11, 2001 terrorist attack where they had unscheduled specials. In 2008, a sequel emerged called The Big Green Help, which was created to promote messages of environmentalism. The name “The Big Help” came back in 2010.

Stars

 Lucas Cruikshank
 Larisa Oleynik
 Katelyn Tarver
 Jake Weary
 Matt Shively
 David Del Rio
 Nathan Kress
 Jennette McCurdy
 Keke Palmer
 Lindsey Shaw
 Drake Bell
 Matt Bennett
 Austin Butler
 James Maslow
 Skyler Day
 Gia Mantegna
 Avan Jogia
 Gage Golightly
 Isabella Castillo
 Devon Werkheiser
 Miranda Cosgrove
 Matthew Underwood
 Ciara Bravo
 Malese Jow
 Victoria Justice
 Leon Thomas III
 Spencer Locke
 Erin Sanders
 Grace Gummer
 Carlos Pena Jr.
 Drew Roy
 Nick Purcell
 Simon Curtis
 Noah Munck
 Tanya Chisholm
 Logan Henderson
 Matthew Moy
 Kendré Berry
 Elizabeth Gillies
 Robbie Amell
 Tyler James Williams
 Ashley Argota
 Jolene Purdy
 Daniella Monet
 Laura Marano
 Ariana Grande
 Annamarie Kenoyer
 Shayna Rose
 Teala Dunn
 Tristin Mays
 Valerie Tian
 Taylor Parks
 Amanda Bynes
Aaliyah

References

External links
 

American children's reality television series
1994 American television series debuts
2001 American television series endings
1990s American children's television series
2000s American children's television series
1990s American reality television series
2000s American reality television series
1990s Nickelodeon original programming
2000s Nickelodeon original programming
Golden CableACE award winners
American children's education television series